Phillippo is a surname. Notable people with the surname include:

 George Phillippo (1833–1914), Chief Justice of Hong Kong
 James Phillippo (1798–1879), British Baptist missionary

See also
 Phillippe